Orhei (Yiddish Uriv – אוריװ), also formerly known as Orgeev, is a city, municipality and the administrative centre of Orhei District in the Republic of Moldova, with a population of 21,065.

History
Orhei takes its name from the Hungarian Őrhely, as it was an outpost of the Hungarian army guarding the gyepű. It was the Ottoman-occupied military center of northern Bessarabia until it was ceded to the Russian Empire in 1812. The word "orhei" was used by local population, meaning "strengthened hill, fortress, deserted courtyard". The name "Orhei" is, derived from the Hungarian word Őrhely or Várhely, the earlier meaning "lookout post", dating from the 13th century, when Hungarian forces built a series of defences in the area. Orhei gets its name from Orheiul Vechi, an active monastery near the village of Ivancea.

Like the rest of Bessarabia, Orhei was taken by the Kingdom of Romania after World War I and was annexed by the USSR in 1940. It was liberated from Axis forces on 6 April 1944, during the Uman–Botoșani Offensive, and was rebuilt after the war. In 1991 it became part of the Republic of Moldova.

Prior to 2003, Orhei was the capital of Orhei County, a large administrative region, but the country was divided further into Raion, or districts.

The St. Dumitru Church built by Vasile Lupu is located in this town.

Ilan Shor was elected mayor in 2015; he served until 2019.  Pavel Verejanu won the 2019 mayoral election in 2019, with about 80% of the vote.  Verejanu was Shor's preferred candidate.

Demographics

While Orhei was still within Bessarabia, the population in 1920 was estimated to be 25,000. At that time, two-thirds of the population were Jewish. The remaining population was Russian, Romanian and Ruthenians. Most people speak Romanian and Russian. There is one school that is taught in Russian.

Economy

Orhei was the first place in what was then known as Bessarabia, to have a successful tobacco industry. The area is also known for wine production.

Religion

Orhei was home to many Jews prior to World War II, and has a large Jewish cemetery. There is only one active synagogue left in the community. The main churches are Romanian Orthodox and Russian Orthodox. Also in the area are: Baptist, Roman Catholic, Seventh-day Adventist Church, the Church of Jesus Christ of Latter-day Saints, the Salvation Army and Jehovah's Witnesses.

Media
Orhei has two local radio stations:
Radio Orhei (101.6 FM) founded in 2005, contains news from region and republic. In 2018, its name was cloned by a broadcaster affiliated to the Șor Party – Radio Orhei FM (97.5 FM). Radio Orhei FM broadcasts news from the Orhei region, Moldova national news, international news, and Russian, Moldovan, and Romanian music.    
There is also an Orhei City Hall site.

Sport
FC Milsami Orhei is based in the city. The team won the Moldovan National Division in 2015.

International relations

Twin towns – Sister cities
Orhei is twinned with:

  Bicaz, Romania
  Piatra Neamț, Romania

Natives

Ilie Cătărău
Jacobo Fijman
Dovid Knut
Mihail Maculețchi
Alex Magala
Rodica Mahu
Pasha Parfeny

Gallery

References

Further reading 
 Orgeyev/Orhei (pp. 372–375) at Miriam Weiner's Routes to Roots Foundation

External links

 

 
Cities and towns in Moldova
Municipalities of Moldova
Orgeyevsky Uyezd
Orhei County (Romania)
Capitals of the counties of Bessarabia
Ținutul Nistru
Orhei District